Hyas is an archer in Greek mythology.

Hyas may also refer to:
 Hyas (genus), a genus of crabs
 Hyas, Saskatchewan, a village in Canada
 HYAS (company), a cybersecurity threat intelligence company